This is a list of astronomical objects formerly widely considered planets under any of the various definitions of this word in the history of astronomy. As the definition of planet has evolved, the de facto and de jure definitions of planet have changed over the millennia. As of 2022, there are 8 official planets in the Solar System by the IAU, and many more exoplanets. Several objects formerly considered exoplanets have been found actually to be stars or brown dwarfs.

Background
Throughout antiquity, several astronomical objects were considered Classical Planets, meaning "wandering stars", not all of which are now considered planets. The moons discovered around Jupiter, Saturn and Uranus after the advent of the telescope were also initially considered planets by some. The development of more powerful telescopes resulted in the discovery of the asteroids, which were initially considered planets. Then Pluto, the first Trans-Neptunian Object, was discovered. More Trans-Neptunian Objects of the Kuiper Belt were found with the help of electronic imaging. One of these, Eris, was widely hailed as a "new planet", which prompted the 2006 recategorization of solar system bodies.

Some planetary scientists reject the 2006 definition of planet, and thus would still consider some of the objects on this list to be planets under a geophysical definition. See the list of gravitationally rounded objects of the Solar System for a list of geophysical planets.

List

See also
 List of gravitationally rounded objects of the Solar System
 List of possible dwarf planets
 List of hypothetical Solar System objects

Notes

References

Former planets
Planets